Flavensomycin is a antibiotic and fungicide with the molecular formula C47H64NO14. Flavensomycin has been first isolated in 1957 from a culture of Streptomyces tanashiensis bacteria.

References

Further reading 

 

Antibiotics
Fungicides
Carboxamides
Esters
Polyketones
Cyclopentenes